Tian Jun (858–903) was a general and warlord during the late Tang dynasty.

Tian Jun may also refer to:
Tian Jun (rower) (born 1982), Chinese rower
James Tien (actor) (born 1942), Hong Kong actor
Xiao Jun (1907–1988), Chinese author, who used the pseudonym Tian Jun early in his career

See also
Tianjun County, a county in northern Qinghai, China